Willie Nelson's Fourth of July Picnic is an annual concert hosted by country music singer Willie Nelson. Nelson was inspired to create the annual concert after his participation in the 1972 Dripping Springs Reunion, that was hosted at Hurlbut Ranch in Dripping Springs, Texas. As part of the lineup, Nelson performed on the third day. The event failed to meet the expected attendance due to the concert being poorly promoted.

Interested in the concept, Nelson decided to host the inaugural Willie Nelson's Fourth of July Picnic in the same place, as it was already prepared to host a concert. The success of the event led to other concerts. During the late 1970s, the bad reputation of the concert for recurrent problems with safety of the audience made it difficult to find venues. During the 1980s the security improved, and the event recovered the trust of the potential venues.

History

Dripping Springs Reunion

Willie Nelson was inspired to start a yearly festival by the 1972 Dripping Springs Reunion, where he was a part of the lineup. In 1971, four music promoters from Dallas, Texas,  decided to create a massive music festival for country music audiences. Edward Allen, Michael McFarland, Don Snyder and Peter Smith, chose the Hurlbut Ranch, owned by James Hurlbut in Dripping Springs, Texas to be the place for the festival. After working on the grounds for months to prepare the site, the festival was set to last three days, between March 17-19, 1972. The lineup included Earl Scruggs, Hank Snow, Sonny James, Tom T. Hall, Tex Ritter, Roy Acuff, Willie Nelson, Waylon Jennings and Kris Kristofferson. Due to the lack of funds, the event was poorly promoted. The expected total attendance was 180,000 to 225,000 for the three days, but it failed to reach 40,000. Security was provided by 123 men on foot, 40 perimeter horse riders, highway patrolmen and two helicopters. According to Nelson's biographer Joe Nick Patoski, the concert "helped spark the rise of progressive country music and recognition of Austin as a music hub".

The picnic
In 1973, Willie Nelson's first 4th of July picnic took place in the same ranch. Nelson selected the place because it was already prepared to hold a concert. The event attracted an estimated attendance of 40,000, and became an annual festival. Before the concert, the Texas Senate Resolution 687 proclaimed July 4, 1975 as "Willie Nelson Day". The organization provided only few portable toilets, while trash was left around the concert site and the town. The event was qualified as "moral pollution" by the local residents. For the bad organization of the concert, Nelson was fined US$1,000 for violating the Texas Mass Gatherings Act. During the late 1970s the bad reputation of the concert often led to problems finding a venue. In 1976, the planned three-day concert had an estimated attendance of 80,000, the largest in the history of the picnic. The concert ended on July 5 after the rain shorted the PA system. An attendant drowned while four were stabbed. There were 140 arrests, four kidnappings, and three reported rapes. Nelson was sued by the ranch owner, the ambulance service and two attendants.

During the 1980s the security was reinforced in the picnics, improving the reputation of the event. The outdoors were fenced and the number of negative incidents reduced. During the 1990s the picnic was often held in Luckenbach, Texas, while in the 2000s the recurrent location was Billy Bob's Texas, at the Fort Worth Stockyards.

In 2020 the Picnic was set to return to the Texas hill country on Nelson's "Luck, TX" property, home to the annual Luck Reunion "anti-festival". In lieu of an in-person festival, Luck Productions produced a virtual event that consisted of live-streamed performances and a 90-minute short film commemorating the history of the event. Participants included: Willie Nelson; Nathaniel Rateliff; Steve Earle; Lyle Lovett; Robert Earl Keen; Margo Price; Edie Brickell; and more.

The next year will be virtual once again; participants TBA.

List of concerts
Willie Nelson's Fourth of July Picnic has been hosted on the following occasions:

References

Country music festivals in the United States
Music festivals established in 1973
Music festivals in Texas
Independence Day (United States) festivals
Willie Nelson